The Changhua County Art Museum is an art museum in Changhua City, Changhua County, Taiwan.

History
The museum was opened on 25 November 2014 and inaugurated by Magistrate Cho Po-yuan. The ceremony was attended by various artists from the county.

Architecture
The museum is housed in an 8-story building which was constructed at a cost of NT$411 million. The building resembles an angled building with steel branches with a shape of bamboo groves and mullion windows.

Transportation
The museum is accessible within walking distance south east from Changhua Station of the Taiwan Railways.

See also
 List of museums in Taiwan

References

External links
  

2014 establishments in Taiwan
Art museums and galleries in Taiwan
Changhua City
Museums established in 2014
Museums in Changhua County